Bishan Sports Hall is situated in the central part of Singapore at Bishan. Bishan Sports Hall is part of the Bishan Sports Recreation Centre, which includes Bishan Stadium and Bishan Sports Complex.

History
Bishan Sports Hall has been the de facto venue for the Singapore Open Gymnastics Championships since 2004. The Pesta Sukan Gymnastics Championship and ASEAN Schools Artistic and Rhythmic Championships were also held here in 2003 and 2004 respectively.

Bishan Sports Hall is the training venue for Singapore's national gymnastics team. Schools, clubs and gymnastics coaches also use the hall for various youth development and training programmes.

2010 Summer Youth Olympics

Bishan Sports Hall was used as a competition venue for gymnastics during the 2010 Summer Youth Olympics.

References

 

Indoor arenas in Singapore
Venues of the 2010 Summer Youth Olympics
Buildings and structures in Bishan, Singapore